Beimen (literally "North gate") is a railway station on the Forestry Bureau Alishan Forest Railway line located in East District, Chiayi City, Taiwan.

History
The station was opened on 1 October 1912. On 16 May 1998 the station caught in fire which resulted the 40% burning of station right side. The Chiayi Forest District Office then planned a budget to restore the station and restoration work with red cypress was completed on 7 November the same year. In August 1999, section of the railway between Fenqihu Station and Alishan Station was badly damaged by Typhoon Morakot. On 20 September 1999, it was damaged again by the 1999 Jiji earthquake. After restoration efforts, a successful trail run of the train between Beimen Station and Alishan Station was made on 16 September 2015.

Architecture
The station is a Japanese architectural style building made of wood.

Around the station
 Chiayi Old Prison
 Chiayi Park
 Hinoki Village
 Renyitan Dam

See also
 List of railway stations in Taiwan

References

1912 establishments in Taiwan
Alishan Forest Railway stations
Railway stations in Chiayi
Railway stations opened in 1912
Rebuilt buildings and structures in Taiwan